Mitchellville is a city in Sumner County, Tennessee, United States. The population was 189 at the 2010 census, down from 207 in 2000.

History
Mitchellville began with the establishment of a  farm by Ezekiel Marshall in 1814.  The community that developed around the farm was originally known as Mitchell's Cross Roads after Hiram Mitchell, who owned land near the intersection of two early roads.  With the arrival of the railroad in 1859, the name of the community was changed to Mitchellville Station.  The city incorporated in 1909, and thrived as a railroad stop throughout the first half of the 20th century.  The city began to decline as rail traffic decreased in the 1950s, however, and never fully recovered from a destructive tornado in 1955.

Geography
Mitchellville lies in north-central Tennessee, just east of the point where Sumner County, Tennessee, Robertson County, Tennessee, and Simpson County, Kentucky, meet.  State Route 259 traverses Mitchellville east-to-west.  To the west of the city, this highway intersects State Route 109, which connects the area to Portland, Tennessee, to the south, and U.S. Route 31W, which connects the area with Franklin, Kentucky, to the north.

Demographics

2020 census

As of the 2020 United States census, there were 163 people, 55 households, and 45 families residing in the city.

2000 census
As of the census of 2000, there were 207 people, 75 households, and 54 families residing in the city. The population density was 398.8 people per square mile (153.7/km2). There were 83 housing units at an average density of 159.9 per square mile (61.6/km2). The racial makeup of the city was 93.72% White, 3.86% African American, 0.97% Native American, and 1.45% from two or more races. Hispanic or Latino of any race were 1.93% of the population.

There were 75 households, out of which 29.3% had children under the age of 18 living with them, 56.0% were married couples living together, 6.7% had a female householder with no husband present, and 26.7% were non-families. 21.3% of all households were made up of individuals, and 10.7% had someone living alone who was 65 years of age or older. The average household size was 2.76 and the average family size was 3.20.

In the city, the population was spread out, with 27.1% under the age of 18, 8.2% from 18 to 24, 27.5% from 25 to 44, 24.6% from 45 to 64, and 12.6% who were 65 years of age or older. The median age was 35 years. For every 100 females, there were 115.6 males. For every 100 females age 18 and over, there were 109.7 males.

The median income for a household in the city was $37,813, and the median income for a family was $40,313. Males had a median income of $24,583 versus $21,250 for females. The per capita income for the city was $15,151. About 17.0% of families and 13.6% of the population were below the poverty line, including 24.3% of those under the age of eighteen and 6.3% of those 65 or over.

References

External links

Municipal Technical Advisory Service entry for Mitchellville — information on local government, elections, and link to charter

Cities in Tennessee
Cities in Sumner County, Tennessee
Cities in Nashville metropolitan area
Populated places established in 1814